Robert Palmer Hunter (September 29, 1846 – April 5, 1925) was an American politician who served in the Virginia House of Delegates.

References

External links 

1846 births
1925 deaths
Democratic Party members of the Virginia House of Delegates
19th-century American politicians